Vítor de Souza Ribeiro (born February 24, 1979 in Rio de Janeiro, Brazil) is a retired professional mixed martial artist who competed in the Lightweight division. A professional competitor since 2001, he has formerly competed for Strikeforce, Shooto, DREAM, Cage Rage, Cage Force, the World Fighting Alliance, and K-1 HERO'S. Ribeiro is the former Cage Rage World Lightweight Champion and the former Shooto World Lightweight Champion.

Brazilian Jiu-Jitsu lineage
Mitsuyo Maeda » Carlos Gracie Sr. » Carlson Gracie » André Pederneiras » Vitor Ribeiro

Mixed martial arts career
Vitor Ribeiro is an accomplished grappler. He has won the CBJJ Mundials (Brazilian Jiu-Jitsu World Championship) four times, once as a purple belt in 1996 and three times as a black belt in three consecutive years (1999, 2000, and 2001). He has competed in the ADCC World Championship in 2000 and 2003.

After a brief absence from the MMA world, Ribeiro returned to competition at DREAM 8, where he dominated former Olympic wrestler Katsuhiko Nagata ending the fight with a TKO. In his next fight at DREAM 10, he lost to Shinya Aoki via unanimous decision.

On September 24, 2009, it was announced that he had signed a multi-fight deal with Strikeforce.

Ribeiro made his promotional debut on May 15, 2010 against undefeated Lyle Beerbohm and lost the bout via split decision.

Ribeiro's next fight for Strikeforce came against Justin Wilcox at Strikeforce Challengers: Wilcox vs. Ribeiro. He lost the fight via unanimous decision.

Retirement
On August 8, 2013 Ribeiro announced that he has retired from mixed martial arts competition.

In 2015, Ribeiro transitioned to becoming a referee for mixed martial arts shows.  He debuted as a referee for UFC events on April 18, 2015 at UFC on Fox: Machida vs. Rockhold.

Vitor is currently the head BJJ instructor at his Manhattan academy as well as in Scotch Plains NJ.

Championships and Accomplishments

Mixed martial arts
Cage Rage
Cage Rage World Lightweight Championship (One time)
Two successful title defenses
Hero's
2007 HERO'S Middleweight Grand Prix Semifinalist
Shooto
Shooto World Lightweight Championship (One time)

Grappling
CBJJ Brazilian Team Championships
2001 Brown/Black Belt Leve: Nova União, 1st Place
2000 Brown/Black Belt Leve: Nova União, 1st Place
1999 Brown/Black Belt Leve: Nova União A, 1st Place
1998 Brown/Black Belt Leve: Nova União, 2nd Place
1997 Brown/Black Belt Leve: Nova União (A), 1st Place
1996 Brown/Black Belt Leve: Nova União, 2nd Place

Mixed martial arts record

|-
| Loss
| align=center| 20–5
| Justin Wilcox
| Decision (unanimous)
| Strikeforce Challengers: Wilcox vs. Ribeiro
| 
| align=center| 3
| align=center| 5:00
| Jackson, Mississippi, United States
| 
|-
| Loss
| align=center| 20–4
| Lyle Beerbohm
| Decision (split)
| Strikeforce: Heavy Artillery
| 
| align=center| 3
| align=center| 5:00
| St. Louis, Missouri, United States
| 
|-
| Loss
| align=center| 20–3
| Shinya Aoki
| Decision (unanimous)
| DREAM 10
| 
| align=center| 2
| align=center| 5:00
| Saitama, Saitama, Japan
| 
|-
| Win
| align=center| 20–2
| Katsuhiko Nagata
| TKO (doctor stoppage)
| DREAM 8
| 
| align=center| 1
| align=center| 7:58
| Nagoya, Japan
| 
|-
| Loss
| align=center| 19–2
| Gesias Cavalcante
| KO (punches)
| HERO'S 10
| 
| align=center| 1
| align=center| 0:35
| Yokohama, Japan
| HERO'S 2007 Middleweight Grand Prix Semi-Final.
|-
| Win
| align=center| 19–1
| Kazuyuki Miyata
| Submission (arm-triangle choke)
| HERO's 9
| 
| align=center| 2
| align=center| 1:54
| Yokohama, Japan
| HERO'S 2007 Middleweight Grand Prix Quarter-Final.
|-
| Win
| align=center| 18–1
| Ryuki Ueyama
| Submission (triangle armbar)
| HERO'S 8
| 
| align=center| 1
| align=center| 1:48
| Nagoya, Japan
| 
|-
| Win
| align=center| 17–1
| Daisuke Nakamura
| Submission (straight armbar)
| Cage Rage 19
| 
| align=center| 1
| align=center| 3:55
| London, England
| Defended Cage Rage World Lightweight Championship
|-
| Win
| align=center| 16–1
| Abdul Mohamed
| Submission (kimura)
| Cage Rage 18
| 
| align=center| 1
| align=center| 4:27
| London, England
| Defended Cage Rage World Lightweight Championship
|-
| Win
| align=center| 15–1
| Chris Brennan
| Submission (swollen eye)
| GFC: Team Gracie vs Team Hammer House
| 
| align=center| 2
| align=center| 3:25
| Columbus, Ohio, United States
| 
|-
| Win
| align=center| 14–1
| Eiji Mitsuoka
| Decision (unanimous)
| MARS
| 
| align=center| 3
| align=center| 5:00
| Tokyo, Japan
| 
|-
| Win
| align=center| 13–1
| Jean Silva
| Submission (arm triangle choke)
| Cage Rage 13
| 
| align=center| 2
| align=center| 4:18
| London, England
| Won Cage Rage World Lightweight Championship
|-
| Win
| align=center| 12–1
| Gerald Strebendt
| Submission (guillotine choke)
| Cage Rage 12
| 
| align=center| 1
| align=center| 1:13
| London, England
| 
|-
| Win
| align=center| 11–1
| Tetsuji Kato
| Submission (arm triangle choke)
| Rumble on the Rock 7
| 
| align=center| 3
| align=center| 2:32
| Honolulu, Hawaii, United States
| 
|-
| Loss
| align=center| 10–1
| Tatsuya Kawajiri
| TKO (punches)
| Shooto: Year End Show 2004
| 
| align=center| 2
| align=center| 3:11
| Tokyo, Japan
| Lost Shooto World Lightweight Championship
|-
| Win
| align=center| 10–0
| Mitsuhiro Ishida
| Decision (unanimous)
| Shooto Hawaii: Soljah Fight Night
| 
| align=center| 3
| align=center| 5:00
| Honolulu, Hawaii, United States
| 
|-
| Win
| align=center| 9–0
| Joachim Hansen
| Submission (arm triangle choke)
| Shooto: Year End Show 2003
| 
| align=center| 2
| align=center| 2:37
| Urayasu, Chiba, Japan
| Won Shooto World Lightweight Championship
|-
| Win
| align=center| 8–0
| Ivan Menjivar
| Decision (unanimous)
| Absolute Fighting Championships 4
| 
| align=center| 3
| align=center| 5:00
| Fort Lauderdale, Florida, United States
| 
|-
| Win
| align=center| 7–0
| Ryan Bow
| Decision (unanimous)
| Shooto: 5/4 in Korakuen Hall
| 
| align=center| 3
| align=center| 5:00
| Tokyo, Japan
| 
|-
| Win
| align=center| 6–0
| Tatsuya Kawajiri
| Decision (unanimous)
| Shooto: Year End Show 2002
| 
| align=center| 3
| align=center| 5:00
| Urayasu, Chiba, Japan
| 
|-
| Win
| align=center| 5–0
| Eddie Yagin
| Submission (arm-triangle choke)
| WFA 3: Level 3
| 
| align=center| 2
| align=center| 2:23
| Las Vegas, Nevada, United States
| 
|-
| Win
| align=center| 4–0
| Hiroshi Tsuruya
| Decision (unanimous)
| Shooto: Treasure Hunt 10
| 
| align=center| 3
| align=center| 5:00
| Yokohama, Japan
| 
|-
| Win
| align=center| 3–0
| Joe Hurley
| Submission (arm-triangle choke)
| WFA 2: Level 2
| 
| align=center| 2
| align=center| 1:19
| Las Vegas, Nevada, United States
| 
|-
| Win
| align=center| 2–0
| Takumi Nakayama
| Submission (arm-triangle choke)
| HOOKnSHOOT: Relentless
| 
| align=center| 1
| align=center| 0:51
| Evansville, Indiana, United States
| 
|-
| Win
| align=center| 1–0
| Charlie Kohler
| TKO (cut)
| World Fighting Alliance 1
| 
| align=center| 1
| align=center| 3:50
| Las Vegas, Nevada, United States
|

References

External links
Official website

Brazilian practitioners of Brazilian jiu-jitsu
People awarded a black belt in Brazilian jiu-jitsu
Brazilian male mixed martial artists
Lightweight mixed martial artists
Mixed martial artists utilizing Brazilian jiu-jitsu
Sportspeople from Rio de Janeiro (city)
Mixed martial arts referees
Living people
1979 births